Gypsy Lane is a railway station on the Esk Valley Line, which runs between  and  via . It is owned by Network Rail and managed by Northern Trains.

History
The station was opened on 3 May 1976 by the Eastern Region of British Railways.

Facilities
In 2013, the station was refurbished, with new and upgraded facilities, including a new fully lit waiting shelter, renewed station signage and the installation of CCTV.

In February 2016, an upgraded next train announcement audio and visual display was installed at the station, with a ticket machine being added in August 2019.

Services 

Following the May 2021 timetable change, the station is served by an hourly service between Middlesbrough and Nunthorpe, with two trains per day (excluding Sunday) continuing to Battersby, and six per day (four on Sunday) continuing to Whitby. Most trains continue to Newcastle via Hartlepool. All services are operated by Northern Trains.

Rolling stock used: Class 156 Super Sprinter and Class 158 Express Sprinter

References

External links
 
 

Railway stations in Redcar and Cleveland
DfT Category F2 stations
Railway stations opened by British Rail
Railway stations in Great Britain opened in 1976
Northern franchise railway stations